The scaled dove (Columbina squammata), also known as scaly dove, Ridgway's dove, mottled dove, and South American zebra dove, is found in Brazil, Bolivia, Argentina, Colombia, French Guiana, Paraguay, Trinidad and Tobago, and Venezuela.
Its natural habitats are subtropical or tropical dry shrubland, subtropical or tropical moist shrubland, subtropical or tropical seasonally wet or flooded lowland grassland, and heavily degraded former forest.

Description 
It measures between 18 and 22 centimeters in length and weighs between 48 and 60 grams. The fire-extinguished dove has grayish brown upper parts, pinkish gray face and chest, the throat is white and the distal wing coverts are also white and form a visible white spot on the wings when they are closed. The tail is dark with the tips of white-colored reeds, with a white band on the side of the tail, noticeable when the bird is in flight. Dark eyes, pink legs and gray beak, this typical of columbiform birds. It has a “scaly” appearance caused by the dark edges of this bird's feathers. The most striking feature of this species is the scaling pattern of the plumage, which provides it with efficient camouflage. When in flight you can see a white stripe at the base of thewing, its primary remedies are brown in color.

Taxonomy 
Its scientific name means : do (Latin) columbina = referring to the Columbidae family; and (Latin) squamatus = referring to scales, scaling.  Pigeon with scales or pigeon with scale. Columbina squammata, also called Fire-blacked out in Brazil, is a columbiform bird in the family Columbidae.

It receives the popular names of rolinha-carijó, Fogo-pagô (onomatopoeic), rol-pedrês, rolinha-rattlesnake, felix-cafofo (Paraíba), paruru and chicken-of-God. In the northernmost region of the Brazilian Northeast, precisely in the interior of the states of Rio Grande do Norte, Paraíba and Pernambuco, Columbina squammata is called by local residents as a rattlesnake or a rattlesnake due to the plumage pattern resembling the snake's scales. rattlesnake ( Crotalus durissus). In addition, the sound that the bird makes when flying resembles the sound of the rattle of the snake Rattlesnake.

It has two recognized subspecies :

 Columbina squammata squammata (Lesson, 1831) occurs in much of eastern Brazil, from southern Pará to northern Rio Grande do Sul, in Bolivia, Paraguay and northeastern Argentina;
 Columbina squammata ridgwayi (Richmond, 1896) occurs from the northeastern coastal region of Colombia to Venezuela, in the Margarita and Trinidad Islands. It has more black at the tip of the feathers than the nominal shape.

Behaviour 
The Columbina squammata is a dove of generally discreet habits, that walks in couples or small groups by the edges of forests, savannahs, orchards, parks and other types of vegetation, excluding the very open or very closed. Its silence is only broken by the vocalization, which the bird only emits perched in well-hidden places, and by the noise produced by the wings when the bird takes flight, resembling a moan. In the Southeast it is considered as a skittish species, being much more heard than seen in cities like Campinas or Ribeirão Preto, but it is curious to note that in Brasília or Goiânia the fire-out is much closer to people, scratching on sidewalks in the same way. than the purple dove (Columbina talpacoti).

Ornithologists and bird watchers in the state of São Paulo have been reporting a certain decline in the populations of this species. Many attribute this decline to competition with the flocked pigeon (Zenaida auriculata), which has been increasing its distribution and abundance.

Breeding 
It makes a nest of twigs in the shape of a cup, usually 1 or 2 meters high, sometimes also on the ground. Lay 2 white eggs.

Diet 
It feeds on the ground, walking with its belly almost dragging on the ground. When scared, it flies sharply to nearby trees. A tree called Crindiuva (Trema micrantha) gives one of the favorite fruits of this species.

References

scaled dove
Birds of Brazil
Birds of Venezuela
Birds of Colombia
Birds of Paraguay
Birds of Trinidad and Tobago
scaled dove
Taxonomy articles created by Polbot